The Off Season is a 2004 independent horror film directed by James Felix McKenney and produced by Larry Fessenden's Glass Eye Pix. It was filmed in Old Orchard Beach, Maine and distributed through Lionsgate Home Entertainment.

Plot 
In the beginning, The Off Season appears to be the story of a young couple from New York City moving up to Maine to get away from it all. Soon, strange things begin to happen in the one-room apartment that they occupy—things that the once close couple cannot discuss with each other. This is not a typical ghost story resulting from a tragic death, but the tale of a place haunted by guilt and the fear of abandonment.

Unlike most traditional ghost stories, which take place in an old mansion, castle or other giant structure, The Off Season is about the haunting of a tiny room. The main characters have nowhere to hide when confronted by unhappy spirits. It can be easy to run away and slam a door between yourself and something that scares you, but few things are more terrifying than being forced to look the source of your fear directly in the eye.

Cast
Angus Scrimm as Ted
Larry Fessenden as Phil
Christina Campanella as Kathryn Bennett
Don Wood as Rick Holland
Ruth Kulerman as Mrs. Farthing
Brenda Cooney as Nora
Jamie Sneider as Stacy
Jordan Kratz as Kurt

Production
The Off Season was shot in a motel in Old Orchard Beach, Maine, a town that neighbors the one in which writer and director James Felix McKenney grew up and shot his first feature, CanniBalistic!

While filming, the cast stayed at the Waves and Viking motels where the film was set.

Reception
Since the film's release it has been regarded as one of the worst movies ever, only garnishing 1.6 stars based on 395 votes on Internet Movie Database and receiving numerous complaints on the site's message board.

References

External links

2004 films
2004 horror films
American haunted house films
Glass Eye Pix films
2000s English-language films
2000s American films